The 2016–17 Evansville Purple Aces women's basketball team represented the University of Evansville during the 2016–17 NCAA Division I women's basketball season. The Purple Aces, led by interim head coach Matt Ruffing, played their home games at the Ford Center and are members of the Missouri Valley Conference. They finished the season 14–17, 8–10 in MVC play to finish in sixth place. They advanced to the semifinals of the Missouri Valley women's tournament where they lost to Northern Iowa.

Previous season
The Aces ended last season 3–28, 1–17 in MVC play to finish in last place. They advanced to the quarterfinals of the Missouri Valley women's tournament where they lost to Drake.

On February 29, 2016, head coach Oties Epps resigned after five years. Matt Ruffing became the interim coach for the remainder of the season and for the current one.

Roster

Schedule

|-
!colspan=9 style=| Non-conference regular season

|-
!colspan=9 style=| Missouri Valley regular season

|-
!colspan=12 style=| Missouri Valley Women's Tournament

See also
 2016–17 Evansville Purple Aces men's basketball team

References

Evansville Purple Aces women's basketball seasons
Evansville
Evansville Purple Aces women's
Evansville Purple Aces women's